Columbia Colonnade (formerly Columbia Mall) was a shopping mall located just outside Bloomsburg, Pennsylvania. It was anchored by EFO Furniture, Planet Fitness, Dunham's Sports, MVP Clubhouse, and a VA Clinic. The mall was next to Interstate 80 and PA 42. It also served the Bloomsburg University of Pennsylvania, as well as several surrounding communities, such as Bloomsburg and Buckhorn, Pennsylvania.

History
Columbia Colonnade's construction was estimated to cost more than $30 million. The mall opened in 1988 with anchors Sears, J. C. Penney, The Bon-Ton, and Hills Department Stores. Sears and J. C. Penney moved from downtown Bloomsburg, Pennsylvania to become anchor stores when the mall opened. The mall was sold early in its existence for $36 million to Heitman Advisory Corp. In 1995, Columbia Mall was sold for $27.6 million. The only anchor change during this time was when Hills converted to Ames in 1999. After the closure of Ames in 2002, the vacant store was used occasionally for the Animal Resource Center Yard Sale, Eagle Arms Gun Show, and WNEP Outdoor Expo. Cedar Shopping Centers (Cedar Bloomsburg LLC) bought the mall in 2005 for $14 million from Bay View Columbia Mall, with reconstruction plans existing in 2008. WP Realty joined as a 25% owner of the mall in 2008.

Non-retail office space leases at the mall started in the early 2010s and included Geisinger Health Plan. Dunham's Sports opened in 2011 occupying most of the empty Ames store. Cedar sold the mall in April 2013 for $2.8 million to Empire Columbia LP and management was replaced. Sears closed in January 2015. EFO Furniture opened in February 2017, occupying a portion of the former Sears. Planet Fitness opened in spring 2017, occupying half of the former Sears. J. C. Penney closed at the mall on July 31, 2017. Bon-Ton closed in 2018 due to the chain's liquidation. MVP Clubhouse opened in Summer 2018, occupying the remaining former Ames.

Columbia Mall was renamed to Columbia Colonnade on November 1, 2018. Greenwood Farm Market, a farmers market, opened at the Colonnade in April 2019. Columbia Colonnade was sold by Empire Columbia LP (Empire Realty Investments) to Foust Holdings LLC for $7 million in July 2019. The mall lost several stores due to the COVID-19 pandemic in 2020. Partial reconstruction plans were announced in July 2020, with a Veterans Affairs office opening planned for August. Three stores remained in the mall's interior during January 2021. Columbia Colonnade during 2021 suffered from drinking water issues, heating/cooling problems, lack of staff including security, and roof leaks. Communication with ownership was complicated, due to them not responding.

The last inline tenant, Outback Roos, closed on March 31st, 2022 along with the mall's interior. The malls deteriorating condition was one of the causes of Outback Roos closure. Columbia Colonnade was originally scheduled to be auctioned in July 2022 with a starting bid of $3.4 million, but that was later delayed until August. Kohan Retail Investment Group made an offer prior to the auction, but it was not accepted. Under Foust's ownership, the mall received $1.4 million in changes. Columbia Colonnade did not sell in August, as the auction failed to meet the reserve price of $20 million.

References

External links
Columbia Mall at deadmalls.com

Buildings and structures in Columbia County, Pennsylvania
Shopping malls established in 1988
Shopping malls disestablished in 2022
Defunct shopping malls in the United States
Shopping malls in Pennsylvania
1988 establishments in Pennsylvania
2022 disestablishments in Pennsylvania